Borisovka is a rural locality (a village) in Ibrayevsky Selsoviet, Aurgazinsky District, Bashkortostan, Russia. The population was 5 as of 2010. There is 1 street.

Geography 
Borisovka is located 19 km northeast of Tolbazy (the district's administrative centre) by road. Berlek is the nearest rural locality.

References 

Rural localities in Aurgazinsky District